Nicholas or Nick Phillips may refer to:
Nick Phillips (cricketer) (born 1974), English cricketer
Nick Phillips, Baron Phillips of Worth Matravers (born 1938), British judge
Nicholas J. Phillips (1933–2009), English physicist
Nick Phillips (graphic designer) (born 1962)